Jet City Improv is a Short Form Improvisation troupe that performs in the Seattle, Washington area.  The troupe was founded in 1992 and is operated by Wing-It Productions.

History

Early days
Jet City Improv was founded in 1992 by Mike Christensen and Andrew McMasters and debuted with a free show on March 18, 1992 at the Second Story Studios (89 Yesler Way, Seattle, WA).  The improv took its name from the nickname of Seattle, "Jet City" in regards to its former city-based aerospace giant, Boeing. In July 1993 Jet City Improv began performing every Friday at 11 pm at the Northwest Actors Studio, until the following October when the show moved to the Belltown Theater Center where they performed Fridays and Saturdays at 10:30pm.  The 10:30pm Friday/Saturday night performance became a tradition that Jet City maintains to this day.

Creation of Wing-It/Jet City and its subsequent significant dates 
In December 1994 Christensen and McMasters founded Wing-It Productions (a 501c3 Non-profit organization) to take on the production of Jet City Improv's activities.  Jet City Improv's performances were relocated to the Ethnic Cultural Theater, on the University of Washington campus in 1997.  In October 1997, Jet City debuted the first Twisted Flick, an improvised re-dubbing of Creature from the Black Lagoon. Jet City produced the first ever Jet City Improv New Year's Eve show on December 31, 1999 entitled the "Y2K Bash" . In June 2000 Twisted Flicks began performing for the Fremont Outdoor Movies.  The following January (2001) Jet City Improv moved performances to the University Heights Center for approximately one year. Twisted Flicks moved into the Paradox Theater in September 2001.

The Lost Folio, Jet City's first longform, premiered in April 2002.  In February 2003 Jet City Improv took over the lease to the former Paradox Theater, thus bringing all  performances into one venue. It was renamed the Historic University Theater.  In February 2003 Jet City Improv co-produced the first annual Seattle Festival of Improv Theater; a national festival of improvisational theater.

Education programming 

Jet City offers a variety of Adult Continuing Education courses including Improv 101, 102, 103, 201, 202, as well as the Performance Series and a Drop-In Dojo.  Classes are held every quarter of the year, and run for eight to twelve week sessions.  Drop-In Dojo is held every Monday from 6-8:00pm and is open to anyone.

Jet City also offers classes and residencies for high, middle, and elementary school students.

Jet City is a leader in corporate workshops focusing on teamwork, creativity and communication.

Outreach programming 

Jet City began an outreach program in early 1998 providing free performances for events, children's camps and fundraisers. This program performs annual performances for the NW Burn Foundation, American Cancer Society and other kids camps. The program was expanded in 2001 to provide free workshops for at risk and incarcerated youth in the Seattle Area. Weekly classes are taught at the Seattle Juvenile Detention facility and the Sanctuary Arts Center.

See also
 List of improvisational theatre companies

Notes

External links 

Culture of Seattle
American comedy troupes
Performing groups established in 1992
Tourist attractions in Seattle